John Reed Jr. (September 2, 1781 – November 25, 1860) was a Representative from Massachusetts.

Reed was  born in West Bridgewater, Massachusetts. He graduated from Brown University, Providence, Rhode Island in 1803, and was a tutor of languages in that institution for two years, and principal of the Bridgewater, Massachusetts Academy in 1806 and 1807. He studied law, was admitted to the bar, and commenced practice in Yarmouth, Massachusetts.

Reed was elected a member of the American Antiquarian Society in 1814, and a Fellow of the American Academy of Arts and Sciences in 1830.

He was elected as a Federalist to the Thirteenth and Fourteenth Congresses (March 4, 1813 – March 3, 1817); elected to the Seventeenth through Twenty-third Congresses; elected as an Anti-Masonic candidate to the Twenty-fourth Congress, and elected as a Whig to the Twenty-fifth and Twenty-sixth Congresses (March 4, 1821 – March 3, 1841). He was chairman of the Committee on Revisal and Unfinished Business (Twenty-second Congress). He declined to be candidate for reelection in 1840.

He was the 17th Lieutenant Governor of Massachusetts (1845–1851).

Reed died in West Bridgewater, Plymouth County, Massachusetts. Interment was in Mount Prospect Cemetery, Bridgewater, Massachusetts.

Reed was the son of John Reed Sr.

References

External links

 

1781 births
1860 deaths
People from West Bridgewater, Massachusetts
Massachusetts Federalists
Federalist Party members of the United States House of Representatives
Fellows of the American Academy of Arts and Sciences
Massachusetts National Republicans
National Republican Party members of the United States House of Representatives
Anti-Masonic Party members of the United States House of Representatives from Massachusetts
Whig Party members of the United States House of Representatives from Massachusetts
Lieutenant Governors of Massachusetts
Members of the American Antiquarian Society
Brown University alumni
19th-century American politicians